= No Strings Attached – Figurentheater & mehr =

Theatre festival in Mainz (Germany)

No Strings Attached – Figurentheater & mehr is a theatre festival in Germany. It is hosted by the Kultursommer Rheinland-Pfalz at the Mainzer Kammerspiele, the KUZ and other unusual venues. It has been held annually in September since 1998. Until 2005, No Strings Attached was still called "Figurentheater Festival". Since 2011, it has been held every two years in May.

The focus of the festival is often based on the summer of culture motto. Despite the small size of only about five to eight plays per year, the festival often features well-known international figure theater.

In addition to the classic open and closed play forms of figure theater, shadow play, station, object or visual theater also find a place, sometimes in public spaces and unusual locations.
